Saint Lucia competed at the 2011 Pan American Games in Guadalajara, Mexico from October 14 to 30, 2011. The Saint Lucia team was made up of four athletes in three different sports.

Athletics

Saint Lucia has qualified two athletes.

Men
Field events

Women
Field events

Cycling

Saint Lucia has received a wildcard to send one male cyclist.

Road cycling
Men

Swimming

Saint Lucia has qualified one female athlete.

Women

References

Nations at the 2011 Pan American Games
Pan
2011